Collette Dormer is a camogie player and student, who played in the 2009 All Ireland camogie final.

Career
An Ashbourne All Star in 2009 and 2010, two years in which she helped Waterford IT to glory, she has also won a Division 1 Colleges league medal to her collection. She has won Under-16, Minor (two) and Intermediate All-Ireland medals. Her senior debut was in 2006. She also played a large role in helping the Kilkenny team reaching the All-Ireland Senior final in 2013 but was unlucky on the day. She returned to colleges camogie for 2014 Ashbourne. She played an unfamiliar role at full back helping the team to the Ashourne Cup Final where they narrowly missed out to U.L. Collette collected her 4th Ashbourne All-Star, with 4 Ashbourne Medals.

Family
Her brother, Stephen, who trained the Kilkenny Under-16 team in 2009, was joint manager of the year for 2008 along with Liam Dunne.

Stephen after helping Kildare camogie in theirAll- Ireland glory in 2013, he now manages the team for the 2014 campaign.

References

External links 
 Official Camogie Website
 Kilkenny Camogie Website
 Review of 2009 championship in On The Ball Official Camogie Magazine
 https://web.archive.org/web/20091228032101/http://www.rte.ie/sport/gaa/championship/gaa_fixtures_camogie_oduffycup.html Fixtures and results] for the 2009 O'Duffy Cup
 All-Ireland Senior Camogie Championship: Roll of Honour
 Video highlights of 2009 championship Part One and part two
 Video Highlights of 2009 All Ireland Senior Final
 Report of All Ireland final in Irish Times Independent and Examiner

1989 births
Living people
Kilkenny camogie players
Waterford IT camogie players